Finland is a European Parliament constituency for elections in the European Union covering the member state of Finland. It is currently represented by fourteen Members of the European Parliament.

Elections

1996

The 1996 election was the first European election for Finland.

1999

The 1999 European election was the fifth election to the European Parliament and the second for Finland.

2004

The 2004 European election was the sixth election to the European Parliament and the third for Finland. Both the Finnish Social Democratic Party and the Finnish Centre Party improved their vote at the expense of the conservative National Coalition Party and the Greens.

2009

The 2009 European election was the seventh election to the European Parliament and the fourth for Finland. The number of seats was decreased to thirteen.

2014

The 2014 European election was the eighth election to the European Parliament and the fifth for Finland. Finland's representation remained at 13 MEPs.

2019

The 2019 European election was the ninth election to the European Parliament and the sixth for Finland. Due to Brexit, Alviina Alametsä became the fourteenth Finnish MEP on February 1, 2020.

References

External links
 European Election News by European Election Law Association (Eurela)
 List of MEPs europarl.europa.eu
 European Parliament elections Statistics Finland

1996 establishments in Finland
Constituencies established in 1996
Constituencies of Finland
European Parliament constituencies
European Parliament elections in Finland